Werner H. Fornos (November 5, 1933 – January 16, 2013) was a German-American activist and politician. An advocate for global population control, he served as president of the Population Institute.

Life 
Fornos was born Werner Horst Farenhold in Leipzig, Germany, and fled to the United States after World War II. He was adopted by the Fornos family and became an American citizen. Fornos served as a member of the Maryland State House of Delegates from 1967 to 1970 as a Democrat. He ran for the House of representatives in 1972 and 1976, losing.

Werner was awarded the Humanist of the Year in 1991 by the American Humanist Association and the United Nations Population Award in 2003. He died on January 16, 2013, in Basye, Virginia from complications of diabetes.

References

External links
YouTube: Gaining People, Losing Ground
94­09­08: Statement of Population Institute, Mr. Werner Fornos
Archives of Maryland (Biographical Series) Werner H. Fornos (1933-2013)

1933 births
2013 deaths
20th-century American politicians
Democratic Party members of the Maryland House of Delegates